Elverta is a census-designated place in Sacramento County, California. It is part of the Sacramento metropolitan area, which includes Sacramento (the state capital and county seat), Arden-Arcade, and Roseville. The population was 5,492 as of the 2010 census.

The ZIP code is 95626, which it shares with other areas of Sacramento County as well as parts of Placer and Sutter counties.

The community has very few hills, and no major bodies of water.

History
The unincorporated community was named for Elverta Dike, whose husband donated property to a local church. The Elverta/Rio Linda community is located on part of the Rancho Del Paso Mexican land grant of 1844.  In 1910, a Fruit Land Company of Minneapolis acquired  of the Grant and in 1912 the area was subdivided. It also runs to the Rio Linda Bike Path.

Geography
Elverta is located at  (38.7137910, -121.4627326).

Climate
According to the Köppen Climate Classification system, Elverta has a warm-summer Mediterranean climate, abbreviated "Csa" on climate maps.

Demographics

2010
The 2010 United States Census reported that Elverta had a population of 5,492. The racial makeup of Elverta was 4,453 (81.1%) White, 117 (2.1%) African American, 77 (1.4%) Native American, 208 (3.8%) Asian, 48 (0.9%) Pacific Islander, 302 (5.5%) from other races, and 287 (5.2%) from two or more races. Hispanic or Latino of any race were 859 persons (15.6%).

The Census reported that 5,486 people (99.9% of the population) lived in households, 6 (0.1%) lived in non-institutionalized group quarters, and 0 (0%) were institutionalized.

There were 1,741 households, out of which 688 (39.5%) had children under the age of 18 living in them, 1,035 (59.4%) were opposite-sex married couples living together, 219 (12.6%) had a female householder with no husband present, 123 (7.1%) had a male householder with no wife present.  There were 106 (6.1%) unmarried opposite-sex partnerships, and 23 (1.3%) same-sex married couples or partnerships. 259 households (14.9%) were made up of individuals, and 83 (4.8%) had someone living alone who was 65 years of age or older. The average household size was 3.15.  There were 1,377 families (79.1% of all households); the average family size was 3.48.

The population was spread out, with 1,387 people (25.3%) under the age of 18, 554 people (10.1%) aged 18 to 24, 1,240 people (22.6%) aged 25 to 44, 1,728 people (31.5%) aged 45 to 64, and 583 people (10.6%) who were 65 years of age or older.  The median age was 38.6 years. For every 100 females, there were 101.0 males.  For every 100 females age 18 and over, there were 97.8 males.

The homeowner vacancy rate was 2.3%; the rental vacancy rate was 3.6%.  4,317 people (78.6% of the population) lived in owner-occupied housing units and 1,169 people (21.3%) lived in rental housing units.

2000
As of the census of 2000, there were 6,178 people, 1,898 households, and 1,573 families residing in the Unincorporated community. As of the census 2008 there were 6,704 people. As of 2000 there were 1,956 housing units at an average density of 738.1 per square mile (285/km2). The racial makeup of the unincorporated community was 80.8% White, 2.40% African American, 2.15% Native American, 2.90% Asian, 0.51% Pacific Islander, 5.51% from other races, and 5.79% from two or more races. Hispanic or Latino of any race were 11.90% of the population.

There were 1,898 households, out of which 40.7% and children under the age of 18 living with them, 63.8% were married couples living together, 13.0% had a female householder with no husband present, and 17.1% were non-families. 11.7% of all households were made up of individuals, and 3.7% had someone living alone who was 65 years of age or older. The average household size was 3.25 and the average family size was 3.50.

The median income per household in the unincorporated community was $46,681, and the median income per family was $17,255. Males had a median income of $39,000 versus $30,893 for females. The per capita income for the city was $17,255. About 8.4% of families and 11.9% of the population were below the poverty line, including 12.2% of those under age 18 and 5.7% of those 65 or over.

Education
Elverta is served by Elverta Joint Elementary School District, which serves Sacramento and Placer counties. The district is a California distinguished school district. It includes Elverta Elementary School, an elementary school serving kindergarten through fifth grade, and Alpha Technology Middle School, a middle school serving sixth through eighth grades. Elverta high school students attend schools in Center Unified School District, Twin Rivers Unified School District, or Roseville Joint High School District.

Government and infrastructure
Elverta is represented by Phil Serna, the District 1 representative on the Sacramento County Board of Supervisors.
The United States Postal Service Elverta post office is located at 161 West Elverta Road.

Adjacent areas

See also
 Sacramento Valley
 Rio Linda, California

References

External links
 First Baptist Church of Elverta

Census-designated places in Sacramento County, California
Populated places established in 1912
1912 establishments in California
Census-designated places in California